Erasmo Vásquez (died 22 April 2021) was a Dominican physician and politician.

Biography
He was minister of Public Health between 1996 and 1998 under the government of Leonel Fernández. He was also president of the Dominican Medical College under Danilo Medina's presidency. 

During the COVID-19 pandemic in the Dominican Republic, he called for a national plan and the use of Ivermectin against COVID-19. He died from COVID-19 on 22 April 2021 at the Santiago Medical Union of Santiago de los Caballeros, where he was admitted last March.

References

2021 deaths
Government ministers of the Dominican Republic
Dominican Republic medical doctors
Deaths from the COVID-19 pandemic in the Dominican Republic